is a Japanese fantasy light novel series written by Miku and illustrated by U35. It began serialization online in January 2014 on the user-generated novel publishing website Shōsetsuka ni Narō. It was later acquired by Futabasha, who have published the series since September 2014 under their Monster Bunko imprint. Hanashi Media has licensed the light novel for an English release. A manga adaptation with art by Sorano has been serialized via Futabasha's digital publication Web Comic Action since September 2017, and it moved to the Gaugau Monster website in December 2019. An anime television series adaptation by Hotline aired from October to December 2021. A second season premiered in January 2023.

Plot
Seiichi Hiiragi is an overweight high school student who is bullied by his classmates for being a "loser." One day, his entire school is suddenly transported to a video game-like world of swords and sorcery. He almost avoided it, thanks to hiding in a niche, but got caught by the God that did it just as it was erasing all evidence the summoned existed. When he unknowingly eats "the Fruit of Evolution," not only does his physical appearance change, but his life as a successful "winner" begins.

Characters
 
 
A generally good-hearted guy, who was abused non-stop at school for being overweight. After being transported to another world by a mysterious god, he eats 10 fruits of evolution enhancing skills and his body to give him a more conventionally attractive appearance. He can learn how to use his new spells and abilities by simply observing them or reading them in books.
 Upon reaching the city of Tillburt, he finds employment as an adventurer at the local guild but after helping defend Tilburt from an army of monsters, he becomes a teacher at Barbador Magical Academy.
 
 
A monster girl belonging to the Kaiser Kong species. She falls in love with Seiichi after witnessing his strength in battle. Much like Seiichi, she eats from fruits of evolution granting her a human appearance. She later gains the ability to switch between her human and Kaiser Kong forms at will. Upon hearing Artoria has fallen in love with Seiichi, Saria comes up with the idea of Seiichi taking both Saria and Artoria as wives.
 Because of her enormous strength, she requires no weapons and instead uses her fists.
 
 
A veteran member of Tillburt's local adventurers' guild. Artoria was born with negative 2 million luck, making her a disaster and was referred as the Calamity so she worked solo as an adventurer, and chase off any friends to keep them safe. Seiichi gifts her a magic ring causes her luck to double into a positive 4 million. Unaware he put it on a proposal finger, she decides to start out as his girlfriend.
In battle, she wields the double-handed Grand-Axe, which can increase her attack power 4 times. Previously, she could channel her bad luck to increase her physical condition, entering as state called "Calamity Berserker". However, it is unknown if she can still use "Calamity Berserker" now her bad luck has been nullified. After receiving additional training from the Valkyries, she learns how to use ice magic. 
 
 
A female donkey Seiichi accidentally evolved into a human by feeding her a fruit of evolution during a race. She has an enormous appetite and will eat huge amounts of food.
 
 
 :A catgirl captured by the Kaiser empire and forced to work as an assassin. She attempts to assassinate King Ranze of Wimburg before being captured by Seiichi, who frees her from slavery and adopts her as a little sister.
 
 
 The student council president for Seiichi's school. She is one of the very few people who did not tease or bully him. Along with most of her classmates, she is recruited into becoming a soldier for the Kaiser empire, but she remains worried for Seiichi's safety. After being transferred to Barbador Magical Academy, she is disappointed to learn her high achievements with her training had made her unpopular with her fellow students.
 
 
 Known as the "Knight of Swords", Louise is the leader of the Valkyries, Wimburg's most prestigious military unit. Since childhood, she has been a prodigy at sword fighting and, despite her low aptitude for magic, she became captain of the Valkyries at a young age. Upon meeting Seiichi, she challenges him to a sparring session, which he wins. Impressed by his skills, she asks him to become his apprentice, to which he reluctantly accepts.
 She is also the sister of Florio Balze, the leader of Wimburg's magical division. She wields a magical weapon called the "Water God's Rapier", which she can use to channel her water magic to perform slashing attacks.
 
 
Guscle is the guildmaster of Telbert Adventure Guild. He loves wearing boomerang pants. He has a big voice and a big body, and is a real brainiac, he's also a masochist and doesn't try to hide it. His trademark is his muscle pose.
 
 
Eris works as a receptionist in the Telbert adventure guild. She was also an ex-S class adventurer. She usually wears receptionist clothes while doing guild related work, and while showing her sadistic side she has a black whip and mask while wearing a blank skin-tight jumpsuit.
 
 
 
 
 A Japanese student who was also teleported into Barbador Magical Academy, alongside Kannazuki.
 
 
 An undead skeletal monster of the "Dark Lord" class. He was formerly a human noble in love with his maid Marie, until he was betrayed by his own emperor and forced to flee to Saria's forest. Upon the death of Marie, he lost his humanity and formed a dungeon where could spend eternity alone with Marie's corpse. He is killed by Seiichi, but his soul is released by from his curse and he is allowed to reunite with Marie in the afterlife.
 
 
 
 
 
 
 
 
 
 
 
 
 
  
 
 
 
 
 
 
 An unseen entity that teleports Seiichi and his classmates into an alternate universe.

Media

Light novels
The series, written by Miku, began serialization online in January 2014 on the user-generated novel publishing website Shōsetsuka ni Narō. It was later acquired by Futabasha, who have published it as a light novel with illustrations by U35 in fifteen volumes from September 2014 to December 2022 under their Monster Bunko imprint. Hanashi Media has licensed the light novel for an English release.

Manga
A manga adaptation with art by Sorano has been serialized via Futabasha's digital publication Web Comic Action since September 2017, and it moved to the Gaugau Monster website in December 2019. It has been collected in nine tankōbon volumes.

Anime
An anime television series adaptation was announced on January 28, 2021. The series was animated by Hotline, with Yoshiaki Okumura directing the series, Gigaemon Ichikawa overseeing the scripts, Minami Eda designing the characters, and Hifumi, Inc. composing the series' music. Feel and Children's Playground Entertainment produced the series. It aired from October 5 to December 21, 2021, on TV Tokyo, BS-TV Tokyo, and AT-X. Yoshino Nanjō performed the opening theme "Evolution:", while Poppin'Party performed the ending theme "Moonlight Walk". Crunchyroll licensed the series outside of Asia. Medialink licensed the series in Asia-Pacific. Crunchyroll began streaming an English dub on May 5, 2022.

On April 1, 2022, it was announced that the series would be receiving a second season. The second season is directed by Shige Fukase, with Yoshiaki Okumura serving as chief director, Iroha Mizuki and Nobuhide Hayashi designing the characters, and Hiroyasu Yano, Alisa Okehazama and Yūki Saitō composing the music. It premiered on January 14, 2023. The opening theme is "Evolution" by Nano, while the ending theme is "Adore Me" by Erii Yamazaki.

Season 1

Season 2

See also
I Got a Cheat Skill in Another World and Became Unrivaled in the Real World, Too - Another light novel series by the same author

Notes

References

External links
  at Shōsetsuka ni Narō 
  
  
 

2014 Japanese novels
Anime and manga based on light novels
Crunchyroll anime
Futabasha manga
Isekai anime and manga
Isekai novels and light novels
Japanese webcomics
Light novels
Light novels first published online
Medialink
Seinen manga
Shōsetsuka ni Narō
TV Tokyo original programming
Webcomics in print